Paszkówka Palace (Polish: Pałac w Paszkówce) - a nineteenth-century Gothic Revival Wężyków family palace located in the village of Paszkówka, located in Lesser Poland Voivodeship, to the south-west of Kraków. Presently, the palace houses a luxury hotel.

Architecture
Paszkówka Palace was designed by renowned, nineteenth-century Kraków architect, Feliks Księżarski, inter alia the designer of Collegium Novum, the main edifice of the Jagiellonian University. The former building was only one storey heigh, with a battlement-finish staircase, which on the  outside forms a tower. 

The palace's architecture is drawn towards the Neo-Gothic architectural style, with elements of English Neo-Gothic. According to architectural critics, the palace fails to live up to all the forms of Neo-Gothic architecture and as such is branded "pseudo-" Gothic. The main distinct architectural properties of the building are that of a Mauretanian tower, avant-corps and pinnacles. Underneath the windows on the first-storey are found mythological motifs. 

The nineteenth-century palace is located in a characteristic English landscape garden type. There, grow old lime, oak and hornbeam trees. Part of the palace-garden complex is Hotel "Spichlerz", that was raised on the authentic foundation of the former granary.

References

Castles in Lesser Poland Voivodeship